In a Man's Womb is the debut album released by French-Israeli singer-songwriter Yael Naïm, which was released under only the name Yael.

Track listing
"Cross"
"In a Man's Womb"
"Maître De Mes Rêves"
"Alone"
"In the Desert"
"Hit (Bla...Bla...)"
"Ils Prétendent"
"Books"
"Ça Ne Fait Rien"
"Do I Do"
"Silence"
"Sharvulim"
"Avril"

Credits
The album was recorded in Los Angeles and produced by Kamil Rustam and Yael Naïm.

2001 debut albums
Yael Naim albums